The 1950 Dixie Classic was a mid-season college basketball tournament held December 28–30, 1950 at NC State's Reynolds Coliseum in Raleigh, North Carolina. It was the second iteration of the Dixie Classic and it was part of the 1950–51 NCAA men's basketball season. 

Coming into the tournament, reigning champion NC State was the clear favorite, but undefeated Navy and 7–1 Duke were noted as possible dark horses. NC State defended their title, beating Colgate Raiders 85–76 in the final. In the consolation bracket final, Duke recovered from a 29-point deficit at halftime to beat Tulane 74–72.

NC State captain Sam Ranzino was voted most outstanding player of the tournament. Dick Groat of Duke led the tournament in scoring with 71 points, 32 of them coming in the final game. Across the three days of six double-headers, the total attendance was 54,200.

Teams
Each year, the Dixie Classic included the "Big Four" teams (Duke, NC State, North Carolina, and Wake Forest), as well as four other invited teams. The 1950 teams were:
 Wake Forest Demon Deacons
 Rhode Island State Rams
 NC State Wolfpack
 Tulane Green Wave
 North Carolina Tar Heels
 Navy Midshipmen
 Duke Blue Devils
 Colgate Raiders

Bracket

Game log

References

1950–51 NCAA men's basketball season
1950 in sports in North Carolina
December 1950 sports events in the United States
1950